Long Island also known as Jumby Bay is an island off the northeast coast of Antigua. It is the fifth largest island of Antigua and Barbuda.

Flora and fauna 
Hawksbill sea turtles (Eretmochelys imbricata) come from turquoise sea to nest on the beaches of island in Pasture Bay.

History
The island was first discovered by an Italian explorer, Christopher Columbus in 1493.

In recent years, notable residents, who belong to the Jumby Bay Club, include David Sainsbury, Baron Sainsbury of Turville, Ken Follett and his wife Barbara Follett, Sir Roland Franklin (Martin E. Franklin's father), and Peter Swann.

Tourism 
Island is home to five star luxury hotel  Jumby Bay Island managed by Oetker Collection.

In popular culture
The island was featured in a 2013 episode of Private Islands and a 2017 episode of Taboo
.

Demographics 
Long Island has one enumeration district, ED 51305. It is part of the city of Vernons.

References

Saint George Parish, Antigua and Barbuda
Private islands of Antigua and Barbuda
Populated places in Antigua and Barbuda